GTTM: Goin Thru the Motions is the fourth mixtape by American rapper and singer PnB Rock. It was released on January 13, 2017, by Empire Distribution and Atlantic Records. Originally marketed as the rapper's debut studio album, Rock later announced that his official debut studio album is the upcoming Catch These Vibes project, presumably meaning that GTTM: Going Thru the Motions is truly a mixtape.

The mixtape features guest appearances from Wiz Khalifa, YFN Lucci, A Boogie wit da Hoodie, Quavo and Ty Dolla Sign, while the production was handled by Donut, DP Beats, J Gramm, Maaly Raw, Murda Beatz, Needlz, Reefa, 12Keyz and Scott Storch, among others. The album was supported by three singles: "Selfish", "Playa No More" and "New Day".

Singles
The mixtapes's lead single, "Selfish", was released on June 23, 2016. The song was produced by Donut and Needlz.

The mixtapes's second single, "Playa No More", was released on December 2, 2016. The song features guest appearances from American rappers A Boogie wit da Hoodie and Quavo.

The mixtape's third single, "New Day", was released on December 16, 2016.

Track listing

Track notes
  signifies a co-producer

Sample credits
 "Hanging Up My Jersey" contains samples from "I Can't Sleep Baby (If I)", performed by R. Kelly.
 "Smile" contains samples from "Girl You Can Leave", performed by Jagged Edge.

Charts

Weekly charts

Year-end charts

Certifications

References

2017 debut albums
Atlantic Records albums
Empire Distribution albums
PnB Rock albums
Albums produced by Cubeatz
Albums produced by Murda Beatz
Albums produced by Scott Storch
Albums produced by Sonny Digital